Ted Laço (born 1 February 1995) is an Albanian footballer who plays as a goalkeeper for Vllaznia Shkodër in the Albanian Superliga.

References

1995 births
Living people
Footballers from Korçë
Albanian footballers
Association football goalkeepers
Albania youth international footballers
FK Dinamo Tirana players
Besa Kavajë players
KF Elbasani players
KF Erzeni players
KF Korabi Peshkopi players
Kategoria Superiore players
Kategoria e Parë players